Albert Douglas (April 25, 1852 – March 14, 1935) was an American lawyer and politician who served two terms as a U.S. Representative from Ohio from 1907 to 1911.

Biography 
Born in Chillicothe, Ohio, Douglas attended the public schools of Chillicothe and a preparatory school.  He graduated from Kenyon College, Gambier, Ohio, in 1872 and from Harvard Law School in 1874.  He was admitted to the bar in 1874 and commenced practice in Chillicothe, Ohio.  He served as prosecuting attorney of Ross County 1877–1881. Presidential elector in 1896 for McKinley/Hobart.

Douglas was elected as a Republican to the Sixtieth and Sixty-first Congresses (March 4, 1907 – March 3, 1911).  He was an unsuccessful candidate for reelection in 1910 to the Sixty-second Congress, and resumed the practice of law in Chillicothe, Ohio.  He was appointed Ambassador Extraordinary to represent the United States at the centennial of the independence of Peru in 1921.  He retired and resided in Washington, D.C., until his death in that city on March 14, 1935.  He was interred in Grandview Cemetery, Chillicothe, Ross County, Ohio, USA.

Sources

External links

 

1852 births
1935 deaths
Politicians from Chillicothe, Ohio
Kenyon College alumni
Harvard Law School alumni
American diplomats
County district attorneys in Ohio
Ohio University trustees
1896 United States presidential electors
Burials at Grandview Cemetery (Chillicothe, Ohio)
Republican Party members of the United States House of Representatives from Ohio